Eina Church is a parish church of the Church of Norway in Vestre Toten Municipality in Innlandet county, Norway. It is located in the village of Eina. It is the church for the Eina parish which is part of the Toten prosti (deanery) in the Diocese of Hamar. The white, wooden church was built in a long church design in 1890 using plans drawn up by the architect Jacob Wilhelm Nordan. The church seats about 250 people.

History
Work for church building at Eina began in the mid-1880s when a building committee was appointed. A plot of land was donated by Ole Johnsrud. In 1888, the parish received architectural drawings made by Jacob Wilhelm Nordan for the new church. The following year, a formal building permit was granted along with a permit to build a burial ground. The church was consecrated on 11 December 1890 by Bishop Arnoldus Hille.

Media gallery

See also
List of churches in Hamar

References

Vestre Toten
Churches in Innlandet
Long churches in Norway
Wooden churches in Norway
19th-century Church of Norway church buildings
Churches completed in 1890
1890 establishments in Norway